Arnaldo David Cézar Coelho (born 15 January 1943) is a former football referee. He was the first Brazilian, indeed the first non-European, to take charge of the FIFA World Cup final when he officiated in the 1982 final between Italy and West Germany.

Coelho's career began as a beach soccer referee; he became professional in 1965 (at one time, famously, telling reporters that he was the highest paid match official in the world) and was appointed to the international list in 1968. He was selected for both the 1978 and 1982 FIFA World Cups. In total he officiated in seven matches during the World Cup finals, three as a referee (the mentioned final from 1982 included).

After the end of his refereeing career, he became a football TV commentator for Rede Globo.

In 2009, The Times listed him in seventh place in its list of "top ten football referees".

Coelho's brother is Ronaldo Cezar Coelho, a representative and founder of the Social Democratic Party in Brazil (PSDB), his mother is from a Moroccan Jewish family.

See also
List of Jews in sports (non-players)

References

External links 
 
 
 

 Arnaldo Cézar Coelho

1943 births
Brazilian Jews
Living people
Brazilian football referees
FIFA World Cup Final match officials
1982 FIFA World Cup referees
1978 FIFA World Cup referees
Copa América referees
Sportspeople from Rio de Janeiro (city)